The 5th Academy Awards were held by the Academy of Motion Picture Arts and Sciences on November 18, 1932, at the Ambassador Hotel in Los Angeles, California, hosted by Conrad Nagel. Films screened in Los Angeles between August 1, 1931, and July 31, 1932, were eligible to receive awards. Walt Disney created a short animated film for the banquet, Parade of the Award Nominees.

Grand Hotel became the only Best Picture winner to be nominated for Best Picture and nothing else. It was the first of five films to date to win Best Picture without a Best Director nomination, followed by Driving Miss Daisy, Argo, Green Book, and CODA; and the third of seven to win without a screenwriting nomination.

This was the first of three Oscars in which two films not nominated for Best Picture received more nominations than the winner (Dr. Jekyll and Mr. Hyde and The Guardsman). This happened again at the 25th and 79th Academy Awards.

This year saw the introduction of short film awards, with Best Short Subject, Cartoon winner Flowers and Trees becoming the first color film to win an Oscar.

There was a tie for Best Actor, a unique event in Academy history; this was the last ceremony to date in which no film won more than two Oscars. By winning Best Actor for The Champ, as well as starring in Grand Hotel, Wallace Beery is the only performer to date to appear in a Best Picture-winning film and win an acting Oscar for a different Best Picture nominee in the same year.

Winners and nominees

Nominees were announced on October 12, 1932. Winners are listed first and highlighted in boldface.

Academy Honorary Award 

 Walt Disney, for the creation of Mickey Mouse

Multiple nominations and awards 

The following seven films received multiple nominations:
 4 nominations: Arrowsmith and The Champ
 3 nominations: Bad Girl, Shanghai Express and Dr. Jekyll and Mr. Hyde
 2 nominations: The Guardsman

The following two films received multiple awards:

 2 awards: Bad Girl and The Champ

See also 

 1931 in film
 1932 in film

Notes

Academy Awards ceremonies
1931 film awards
1932 film awards
1932 in Los Angeles
1932 in American cinema
November 1932 events in the United States